The 24th Day is a 2004 American psychological thriller drama film written and directed by Tony Piccirillo (in his directorial debut), based on his play of the same name. The film stars James Marsden and Scott Speedman. It premiered at the Tribeca Film Festival on May 6, 2004.

Plot
Tom (Scott Speedman) and Dan (James Marsden) meet in a bar and then proceed to Tom's apartment together.  While there, Dan realizes that he had been in that same apartment before.  Five years earlier, Dan and Tom had a one night stand there.  According to Tom, that encounter with Dan was his first and only homosexual experience.  Some years later, Tom's wife is found to be HIV positive.  Despondent after receiving this diagnosis from her doctor, she drives through a red traffic light and is killed in an ensuing collision.

Subsequent to these events, medical tests reveal that Tom is also HIV positive.  Tom blames himself for passing HIV on to his wife and, in turn, he blames Dan for passing the virus on to him.  Reasoning that Dan, ultimately, is to blame for his wife's death, Tom devises a plan to exact revenge.  He holds Dan hostage, keeping him bound and gagged to a chair in his apartment. He draws blood from Dan in order to conduct a test to determine Dan's HIV status.  If Dan's test results are positive for HIV, Tom vows to kill Dan.  If the results are negative, Tom agrees to release Dan unharmed.

In the end, Tom returns to the apartment and lets Dan go. As Dan is leaving, Tom asks him when he had last been tested. A few moments later, he reveals that Dan's test was, in fact, positive. He decided to let Dan go because he realized that his positive status was the result of his choices which he couldn't blame on anyone else. The screen fades with Dan standing in Tom's doorway in shock.

Cast
 James Marsden as Dan
 Scott Speedman as Tom
 Sofía Vergara as Isabella
 Barry Papick as Mr. Lerner
 Charlie Corrado as Officer #1
 Jarvis W. George as Officer #2
 Scott Roman as The Bartender
 Jeffrey Frost as Dan's Assistant
 Jona Harvey as Marla
 Thea Chaloner as Wife
 Brian Campbell as Blondie
 Zach The Dog as Lerner's Dog

Release
The film had its world premiere at the 3rd Tribeca Film Festival on May 6, 2004. It was released in limited theaters in the United States on May 14, 2004, and on DVD on August 31, 2004.

Reception
On Rotten Tomatoes, The 24th Day holds an approval rating of 27% based on 15 reviews, with an average rating of 4.30/10. On Metacritic, the film has a weighted average score of 29/100 based on 6 critics, indicating "generally unfavorable reviews". Robert Koehler of Variety wrote that "the movie is never more than a hesitantly filmed recording of the play".

References

External links
 
 

2004 films
2004 directorial debut films
2004 drama films
2004 independent films
2004 LGBT-related films
2004 psychological thriller films
2004 thriller drama films
2000s English-language films
2000s psychological drama films
American films based on plays
American independent films
American LGBT-related films
American psychological drama films
American psychological thriller films
American thriller drama films
Films scored by Kevin Manthei
Films set in Philadelphia
Films shot in Philadelphia
Gay-related films
HIV/AIDS in American films
LGBT-related thriller drama films
Male bisexuality in film
2000s American films